Carlos Castro may refer to:

Carlos Salazar Castro (1800–1867), Central American military officer and Liberal politician
Carlos Castro (actor) (1913–1958), Argentinian actor, featured in Buenos Aires a la vista, La Verdadera victoria and Intermezzo criminal
Carlos Castro (writer) (born 1944), Salvadoran writer
Carlos Castro (journalist) (1945–2011), Portuguese journalist

Sportspeople
Carlos Alberto Castro (born 1970), Colombian football player and coach, twice top goal scorer in the Colombian Categoría Primera A
Carlos Castro Borja (born 1967), Salvadoran footballer
Carlos Castro (Ecuadorian footballer) (born 1978), Ecuadorian footballer for Deportivo Cuenca
Carlos Castro (footballer, born 1974), former Spanish footballer
Carlos Castro (footballer, born 1995), Spanish footballer
Carlos Castro (footballer, born 1978), Costa Rican footballer
Carlos Castro (sprinter) (born 1949), Mexican Olympic sprinter
Carlos Castro (water polo) (born 1909), Argentine Olympic water polo player
Carlos Luis Castro (born 196?), Costa Rican footballer
Carlos Castro (Venezuelan footballer)
Carlos Castro (boxer) (born 1994), American boxer

See also
Carlos de Castro (1979–2015), Uruguayan footballer
Carlos de Castro, member of Spanish heavy metal band Barón Rojo